Adin (formerly, Adinville and Aidenville) is a census-designated place in Modoc County, California. Its population is 205 as of the 2020 census, down from 272 from the 2010 census.

Each summer, the town hosts the annual Golden State Star Party, a gathering of amateur and professional astronomers from California and parts of the United States.

History
Adin, the first town in Modoc County west of the Warner Mountains, was founded in 1869 by Adin McDowell as the supply point for the mining town of Hayden in northern Lassen County, and was named for him in 1870.  The Aidenville post office opened in 1871, and changed its name to Adin in 1876.

A 1913 book described Adin as having a population of 200, and as the chief town of the Big Valley.  It became a sawmill town in the mid-1930s when the Edgerton Brothers Mill moved into town, from the Adin Mountains.

The town suffered devastating fires in 1904, 1915, 1931, and finally in 1939.  Following the 1939 fire, the town organized a volunteer fire brigade.

Geography
According to the United States Census Bureau, the CDP covers an area of 3.4 square miles (8.9 km), 99.82% of it land, 0.18% of it water.

Climate
This region experiences warm (but not hot) and dry summers, with no average monthly temperatures above 71.6 °F.  According to the Köppen Climate Classification system, Adin has a warm-summer Mediterranean climate, abbreviated "Csb" on climate maps.

Demographics

2010
The 2010 United States Census reported that Adin had a population of 272. The racial makeup of Adin was 240 (88.2%) White, 2 (0.7%) African American, 8 (2.9%) Native American, 0 (0.0%) Asian, 0 (0.0%) Pacific Islander, 9 (3.3%) from other races, and 13 (4.8%) from two or more races. Hispanic or Latino of any race were 32 persons (11.8%).

The Census reported that 269 people (98.9% of the population) lived in households, 3 (1.1%) lived in non-institutionalized group quarters, and 0 (0%) were institutionalized.

There were 124 households, out of which 28 (22.6%) had children under the age of 18 living in them, 49 (39.5%) were opposite-sex married couples living together, 14 (11.3%) had a female householder with no husband present, 8 (6.5%) had a male householder with no wife present.  There were 10 (8.1%) unmarried opposite-sex partnerships, and 0 (0%) same-sex married couples or partnerships. 45 households (36.3%) were made up of individuals, and 19 (15.3%) had someone living alone who was 65 years of age or older. The average household size was 2.17.  There were 71 families (57.3% of all households); the average family size was 2.82.

The population was spread out, with 57 people (21.0%) under the age of 18, 19 people (7.0%) aged 18 to 24, 52 people (19.1%) aged 25 to 44, 93 people (34.2%) aged 45 to 64, and 51 people (18.8%) who were 65 years of age or older.  The median age was 47.3 years. For every 100 females, there were 91.5 males.  For every 100 females age 18 and over, there were 85.3 males.

The homeowner vacancy rate was 1.3%; the rental vacancy rate was 2.1%.  163 people (59.9% of the population) lived in owner-occupied housing units and 106 people (39.0%) lived in rental housing units.

2000

In the 2000 census, the United States did not define a census-designated place called Adin, but it did define a Zip Code Tabulation Area (ZCTA), 96006. Because Adin is contained within this ZCTA, it is possible to obtain Census data from the United States 2000 Census for the area even though data for "Adin" is unavailable. Adin is located within area code 530.

As of the census of 2000, there were 599 people, 257 households, and 178 families residing in the ZCTA of 96006.  The racial makeup of the town was 93.7% White, 0.3% Black or African American, 1.5% Native American, 0.2% Asian, 2.7% from other races, and 1.7% from two or more races.  5.7% of the population were Hispanic or Latino of any race.

There were 257 households, out of which 26.8% had children under the age of 18 living with them, 59.5% were married couples living together, 6.6% had a female householder with no husband present, and 30.7% were non-families. 24.9% of all households were made up of individuals, and 8.6% had someone living alone who was 65 years of age or older.  The average household size was 2.33 and the average family size was 2.79.  Adin has a general store.

The median income for a household in the town was $32,250, and the median income for a family was $34,063. Males had a median income of $36,250 versus $30,000 for females. The per capita income for the town was $20,642.  17.2% of the population and 11.3% of families were below the poverty line.  Out of the total population, 27.7% of those under the age of 18 and 7.5% of those 65 and older were living below the poverty line.

Politics

References

Census-designated places in Modoc County, California
Populated places established in 1869
Census-designated places in California
1869 establishments in California